The 2006 Food City 500 was an event held at Bristol Motor Speedway on March 26, 2006, as the fifth race in the 2006 NASCAR Nextel Cup Series season.

Qualifying 
Qualifying was canceled due to extreme weather conditions, so the field was set with the top 35 owners points from 2005, the Champion's Provisional (for Terry Labonte) and seven others, based on qualifying attempts in 2006. As a result, 2005 champion Tony Stewart sat on the pole.

 Tony Stewart #20 Home Depot Chevrolet Joe Gibbs Racing
 Greg Biffle #16 Subway/National Guard Ford Roush Racing
 Carl Edwards  #99 Office Depot Ford Roush Racing
 Mark Martin#6 AAA Ford Roush Racing
 Jimmie Johnson #48 Lowe's Chevrolet Hendrick Motorsport
 Ryan Newman #12 Alltel Dodge Penske Racing
 Matt Kenseth  #17 USG Sheetrock/DeWalt Ford Roush Racing
 Jamie McMurray #26 Sharpie Ford Roush Racing
 Kurt Busch #2 Miller Lite Dodge Penske Racing
 Jeremy Mayfield #19 Dodge Dealers/UAW Dodge Evernham Motorsport
 Jeff Gordon #24 DuPont Chevrolet Hendrick Motorsport
 Casey Mears #42 Texaco/Havoline Dodge Chip Ganassi Racing
 Elliott Sadler #38 M&M's Ford Robert Yates Racing
 Kevin Harvick #29 GM Goodwrench Chevrolet Richard Childress Racing
 Dale Jarrett #88 UPS Ford Robert Yates Racing
 Joe Nemechek #01 U.S. Army Chevrolet MB2 Motorsport
 Brian Vickers #25 GMAC Chevrolet Hendrick Motorsport
 Jeff Burton #31 Cingular Wireless Chevrolet Richard Childress Racing
 Dale Earnhardt Jr. #8 Budweiser Chevrolet Dale Earnhardt Inc
 Kyle Busch #5 Kellogg's Chevrolet Hendrick Motorsport
 Ken Schrader #21 Little Debbie Ford Wood Brothers
 Reed Sorensen* #41 Target Dodge Chip Ganassi Racing
 Kasey Kahne #9 Dodge Dealers/UAW Dodge Evernham Motorsport
 J. J. Yeley* #18 AsthmaControl.com Chevrolet Joe Gibbs Racing
 Martin Truex Jr.* #1 Bass Pro Shops Chevrolet Dale Earnhardt Inc
 David Stremme* #40 Lone Star Steakhouse Dodge Chip Ganassi Racing
 Clint Bowyer* #07 Jack Daniels Chevrolet Richard Childress Racing
 Kyle Petty #45 Schwans Dodge Petty Enterprises
 Jeff Green #66 Best Buy Chevrolet Haas CNC Racing
 Bobby Labonte #43 Cheerios Dodge Petty Enterprises
 Brent Sherman* #49 Serta Dodge BAM Racing
 Dave Blaney #22 Caterpillar Dodge Bill Davis Racing
 Denny Hamlin* #11 FedEx Chevrolet Joe Gibbs Racing
 Michael Waltrip #55 NAPA Dodge Waltrip-Jasper Racing
 Sterling Marlin #14 Waste Management Chevrolet MB2 Motorsport
 Terry Labonte #96 DLP HDTV Chevrolet Hall of Fame Racing
 Robby Gordon #7 Menards Chevrolet Robby Gordon M'tsport
 Scott Riggs #10 Valvoline Dodge Evernham Motorsport
 Kevin Lepage #61 RoadLoans.com FordPeak Performance M'tsport
 Scott Wimmer #4 Aero Exhaust Chevrolet Morgan McClure M'tsport
 Travis Kvapil #32 Tide Chevrolet  PPI Motorsport
 Hermie Sadler #00 Aaron's Ford Michael Waltrip Racing
 Stanton Barrett #95 hairofdog.com Chevrolet Barrett Racing

Did Not Qualify

 DNQ. Kenny Wallace #78 Furniture Row Chevrolet Furniture Row Racing
 DNQ. Mike Garvey #51 Marathon Oil ChevroletCompetitive Edge M'sport
 DNQ. Mike Skinner #37 Dodge R&J Racing
 DNQ. Derrike Cope #74 Royal Admin Dodge McGlynn Motorsports
 DNQ. Morgan Shepherd #89 Dutch Quality Stone Dodge Morgan Shepherd Racing
 DNQ. Chad Blount #92 Chevrolet Front Row Motorsports
 DNQ. Chad Chaffin* #34 Kingsport Iron Chevrolet Front Row Motorsports

* Denotes Raybestos Rookie of the Year candidate ** Denotes Owner Points required *** Denotes Past Champions Provisional Needed

Race recap
Qualifying was cancelled on March 24 due to snow, sleet and rain, and the field was set with top 35 owners points from 2005, the Champion's Provisional (for Terry Labonte) and seven others, based on qualifying attempts in 2006. As a result, 2005 champion Tony Stewart sat on the pole.

The race featured 18 cautions, and over 100 of the 500 laps were run under the yellow flag. Points leader Jimmie Johnson made contact with the car of Reed Sorenson, which caused a flat tire and put the #48 car several laps down; this would lead to him finishing 30th. Lap 188 saw the most notable wreck of the first half of the race, where Clint Bowyer spun Dave Blaney, causing a chain reaction collecting David Stremme, Brian Vickers, and Michael Waltrip. This brought out a red flag to cleanup.

Jeff Gordon spun Martin Truex Jr. out on lap 415, collecting Jeff Burton, Robby Gordon, and J. J. Yeley. Kurt Busch, who had made up two laps lost earlier in the day due to tire problems, used the "bump-and-run" to nudge Matt Kenseth out of the lead with four laps to go. Gordon used the same tactic to take third but on the final lap, Kenseth used the bump and run to spin Gordon out as Busch raced to victory. Gordon finished 21st and was involved in a shoving match with Kenseth on pit road after the race, for which he was put on probation and fined $10,000 by NASCAR.

Besides the dyed between Gordon and Kenseth, there also was bitter rivalry shown between Busch and Kevin Harvick following contact last week at Atlanta. During the pre-race ceremonies and in the drivers meeting, Harvick spent his time taunting Busch for no good reason. Busch ignored his insults and dismissed reporters. Harvick had been complaining about Busch all week and once retorted that Roger Penske (Busch's team owner) would make a fool of himself in hiring Busch. NASCAR warned Busch and Harvick that if they got into a feud on the track, they would get penalized. Busch later won the race and Harvick ended up second. When interviewed, Kevin was not finished and said "I am glad for my second-place spot but seeing Kurt [Busch] up there is terrible. I hate to see him win. He is a big whiner."

The win was Busch's fifth in 11 career races at the track and the fifteenth in his career. It was Dodge's first win at Bristol since Richard Petty in 1975.

Race results

Failed to make field: Chad Chaffin (#34), Mike Skinner (#37), Mike Garvey (#51), Derrike Cope (#74), Kenny Wallace (#78), Morgan Shepherd (#89), Chad Blount (#92).

References

Food City 500
Food City 500
NASCAR races at Bristol Motor Speedway
Food City 500